Amphipholis is a large genus of brittle stars (Ophiuroidea) found in oceans worldwide from tropics to Arctic and Antarctic regions. Some species have been used to study echinoderm development (Amphipholis kochii) and bioluminescence (the Dwarf brittle star, Amphipholis squamata).

Systematics
Amphipholis is a large genus with potentially many cryptic species. The high variability may be due to common parthenogenetic reproduction. The type species of the genus is Amphipholis januarii  Ljungman, 1866(=Amphipholis gracillima (Stimpson, 1852)).

Species include:

References

Amphiuridae